Bruno Wavzinkevicz Ribeiro (born 22 April 1997), known as Bruno Jesus, is a Brazilian professional footballer who plays as a defender for the U23-team of Desportivo Aves.

Professional career
Jesus made his professional debut with Esporte Clube São José in a 2-0 Campeonato Gaúcho win over Grêmio on 28 January 2018. On 2 August 2019, Jesus signed with Aves in the Portuguese Primeira Liga.

References

External links
 
 ZeroZero Profile

1997 births
Living people
Footballers from Porto Alegre
Brazilian footballers
C.D. Aves players
Esporte Clube São José players
Campeonato Brasileiro Série C players
Campeonato Brasileiro Série D players
Association football defenders
Brazilian expatriate footballers
Expatriate footballers in Portugal